Richard Leo Simon (March 6, 1899 – July 29, 1960) was an American book publisher. He was a Columbia University graduate, co-founder of the publishing house Simon & Schuster, and father of singer-songwriter Carly Simon.

Early life
Richard Leo Simon was born on March 6, 1899, to a Jewish family in New York City. His father, Leo Simon, was a wealthy feather-and-silk manufacturer and milliner of German Jewish origin, and his mother, Anna (Meier), was a German Jewish immigrant. He was the eldest of five siblings (Henry, Alfred, George, and Elizabeth) who were all named after British monarchs. His brother George T. Simon was a jazz drummer with Glenn Miller for a time, and then a critic, magazine editor and author of books on jazz, particularly big bands and the swing era.  His brother Henry W. Simon was a professor of English at Teachers College, Columbia University, then classical music critic for the newspaper PM, and the author of many books on opera. Eventually he became an editor and vice-president at Simon & Schuster. His brother Alfred was a rehearsal pianist for the Gershwins, the programmer for light opera and show music for WQXR, and the author of a number of books about musical theatre. His sister Elizabeth Seligman was married to Arthur Seligmann, a physician. Simon's parents joined the Ethical Culture movement, which emphasized universal morality, and sent Simon to the Ethical Cultural School and then Columbia University.

Simon served in World War I and upon his return to the United States, being a talented piano player, worked as a piano salesman before beginning his career as a book publisher.

Career
Simon began his career as a sugar importer and then became a piano salesperson. It was while selling pianos that he met Max Schuster. 
Simon then became a salesperson for the publisher Boni & Liveright where he quickly rose to sales manager.

Simon pooled $8,000 together with Max Schuster to publish the first book of crossword puzzles in 1924.

Simon was a pioneer in emphasizing marketing, merchandising, promotion and advertising for booksellers. Simon wrote a weekly column and advertorial in Publishers Weekly called the Inner Sanctum. His partner Max Schuster wrote a column of the same name for The New York Times. The title was also the name of the editorial room between their offices.

Michael Korda said that when he arrived to work as an editor at Simon and Schuster in 1958, he found a bronze plaque on his desk designed by Richard Simon that said, "Give the reader a break." This was a reminder to every editor that their job was to make things as easy and clear for the reader as possible.

Simon retired in 1957 after having two heart attacks.

Personal life
On August 3, 1934, Simon married Andrea Heinemann who worked as a switchboard operator at Simon & Schuster. Raised in Philadelphia, Andrea was the daughter of a Cuban-born, Roman Catholic mother, Asuncion Maria del Rio, and a German-speaking Swiss father who had abandoned the family. (Andrea also asserted she was of partial "Moorish" origin based on her mother's exotic looks, but was in fact of Afro-Cuban descent).

They had four children:
former opera Mezzo-soprano singer and New York real estate agent, Joanna Simon
Broadway score writer Lucy Simon
singer-songwriter Carly Simon
nationally renowned photographer, Peter Simon (1947–2018)

Death
Simon died in 1960 after suffering a heart attack. Simon was a resident of Fieldston, an area within Riverdale in the Bronx.

References

External links
 Timeline 1898–1899
 Finding aid to Richard L. Simon papers at Columbia University. Rare Book & Manuscript Library.

1899 births
1960 deaths
American book publishers (people)
American military personnel of World War I
American people of German-Jewish descent
Businesspeople from New York City
Columbia College (New York) alumni
People from Riverdale, Bronx
Carly Simon
Simon & Schuster books
Simon family (publishing)